Varun Bhisham Sahni (born March 29, 1956) is an Indian theoretical physicist, astrophysicist and a Distinguished Professor at the Inter-University Centre for Astronomy and Astrophysics. Known for his research on cosmology, Sahni is an elected fellow of all the three major Indian science academies viz. Indian Academy of Sciences, Indian National Science Academy and National Academy of Sciences, India. The Council of Scientific and Industrial Research, the apex agency of the Government of India for scientific research, awarded him the Shanti Swarup Bhatnagar Prize for Science and Technology, one of the highest Indian science awards, for his contributions to physical sciences in 2000.

Sahni is reported to have studied the universe, more specifically its large-scale structure, the early inflationary phase and cosmological constant. His achievements include the establishment of a cosmic no-hair theorem related to inflation, analysis of the universe structure using self-developed statistical methods, discovery of novel models of dark energy and dark matter, design of unified models of Inflation and dark energy and the elucidation of Big Bang theory using Braneworld physics. His studies have been documented by way of a number of articles and the online article repository of the Indian Academy of Sciences has listed 68 of them.

Sahni is a member of the International Astronomical Union. He has delivered plenary addresses at many conferences and seminars; "Cosmology after the BOOMERANG experiment" delivered at the Astronomy Seminars 2000 of the Tata Institute of Fundamental Research and Frontiers of Cosmology and Gravitation (ICGC 2011) of the International Centre for Theoretical Sciences
were two of them. The School of Applied Mathematical and Physical Sciences of the National Technical University of Athens has listed one of his talks on Dark matter and dark energy, delivered in March 2004, as the best cited among Aegean School talks. He is also a recipient of the Homi Bhabha Medal (2014) of the Indian National Science Academy.

Selected bibliography

Chapters

Articles

See also 

 Somak Raychaudhury

Notes

References

External links 
 
 
 
 

Recipients of the Shanti Swarup Bhatnagar Award in Physical Science
Indian scientific authors
1956 births
Fellows of the Indian Academy of Sciences
Fellows of the Indian National Science Academy
Fellows of The National Academy of Sciences, India
Indian theoretical physicists
Indian astrophysicists
Living people